Miller Lite is a 4.2% ABV light American lager beer sold by Molson Coors (previously MillerCoors) of Chicago, Illinois. The company also produces Miller Genuine Draft and Miller High Life. Miller Lite competes mainly with Anheuser-Busch's Bud Light.  Miller Lite is  the official beer sponsor of the Green Bay Packers, Milwaukee Brewers, Milwaukee Bucks, Dallas Cowboys, Baltimore Ravens, Chicago Bears, and Bellator MMA.

History
Miller Lite was the first successful mainstream light beer in the United States. After its first inception as "Gablinger's Diet Beer", developed in 1967 by Joseph L. Owades, PhD, a biochemist working for New York's Rheingold Brewery, the recipe was given by Owades to Chicago's Peter Hand Brewing. That year, Peter Hand Brewing was purchased by a group of investors, renamed Meister Brau Brewing, and Lite was soon introduced as Meister Brau Lite, a companion to their flagship Meister Brau. Under the new management, Meister Brau Brewing encountered significant financial problems, and in 1972, sold several of its existing labels to Miller. The recipe was relaunched simply as "Lite" on packaging and in advertising (with "Lite Beer from Miller" being its "official" name until the late '90s) in the test markets of Springfield, Illinois; Providence, Rhode Island; Knoxville, Tennessee; and San Diego, California, in 1973, and heavily marketed using masculine pro sports players and other so-called macho figures of the day in an effort to sell to the key beer-drinking male demographic. Miller Lite was introduced nationally in 1975.

Miller's heavy-advertising approach worked where the two previous light beers had failed, and Miller's early production totals of 12.8 million barrels quickly increased to 24.2 million barrels by 1977 as Miller rose to 2nd place in the American brewing marketplace. Other brewers responded, in particular Anheuser-Busch with its heavily advertised Bud Light in 1982, which eventually overtook Lite in sales by 1994. Anheuser-Busch played on the branding style of "Lite" by highlighting the fact that their beer was called "Bud Light" as "everything else is just a light". In 1992, light beers became the biggest domestic beer in America, and in 1998, Miller relabeled its "Lite" brand as "Miller Lite".

In 2008, Miller Brewing Company test-marketed three new recipes – an amber, a blonde ale, and a wheat – under the Miller Lite brand, marketed as Miller Lite Brewers Collection.

In December 2013, as part of a product placement marketing campaign with the film Anchorman 2: The Legend Continues, Miller reintroduced the 1974 navy-blue blackletter font "Lite" packaging on its  cans for a limited time (the original 1972 cans used a light-blue script logo). However, the vintage packaging was such a success that by September 2014, the company decided to switch back to the vintage packaging full-time, including on bottles and tap handles, mirroring the unexpected success that PepsiCo had in 2009 with its Pepsi Throwback & Mountain Dew Throwback lines in tapping into the retro-themed packaging market. The unexpected sales increase, combined with wanting to differentiate the packaging from Bud Light, were factors in the decision, with some consumers even stating that Miller actually improved on the taste when nothing changed in the beer itself.

Awards
At the 2010 and 2014 Great American Beer Festival, Miller Lite won the gold medal for Best American Style Lager or Light Lager, besting  Miller Genuine Draft. The beer ranked #1 on the list of top 100 beers by the Cold Cans podcast.

Advertising

Miller Lite's long-running "Tastes Great!...Less Filling!" advertising campaign was ranked by Advertising Age magazine as the eighth best advertising campaign in history. The campaign was developed by the advertising agency McCann-Erickson Worldwide. In the prime of the campaign, television commercials typically portrayed a Lite Beer drinker noting its great taste followed by another who observed that it was less filling. This usually led to a parody of Wild West saloon fights in which every patron got involved in the dispute for no real reason, though in this case it was always a shouting match, and blows were never thrown. The commercials were closed with a voice-over from actor Eddie Barth, who read the slogan, "Lite Beer from Miller: Everything you've always wanted in a beer. And less."

The then-recently retired New York Jets running back Matt Snell was the first person to appear in Miller Lite's first commercial in 1973.

To attract 'Joe Sixpack' to a light beer, these commercials started to feature both elite ex-athletes such as Ray Nitschke, Ben Davidson, and Bubba Smith but also oddball cultural figures such as Mickey Spillane (accompanied by a blonde, Lee Meredith, who is better known for her role as Ulla, the secretary in The Producers), and comedian Rodney Dangerfield. As the series of commercials went on, it began featuring athletes and celebrities of all sorts. Some commercials from this era include:

 Former Major League catcher and Milwaukee Brewers broadcaster Bob Uecker being moved from his seat at a ballgame, and escorted away by an usher. Uecker exclaims "I must be in the front row," but ends up in the back row of the stands. This gave rise to the term "Bob Uecker seats".
Heavyweight boxing champion Joe Frazier walking into a full bar as part of a barbershop quartet while the on-screen caption says "Joe Frazier, Famous Heavyweight Singer". The quartet sings "do like Smokin' Joe" and the song goes on to praise Miller Lite's advantages.
 Former Baltimore Orioles first baseman Boog Powell and former umpire Jim Honochick doing a spot together, with Honochick unaware who he is standing next to, until he puts his glasses on at the end, and exclaims, "Hey, you're Boog Powell!"
 Footballer and actor Bubba Smith proclaims at the end of a spot, "I also love the easy-opening can", then tears off the top third of an aluminum Miller Lite can. In a later ad, pro ten-pin bowler Don Carter laments that bowlers are athletes too, and attempts to prove it by repeating Smith's feat, but struggles to do so.
 When Billy Martin and George Steinbrenner were in the middle of their 1970s feuds, they did an ad with Martin saying, "Tastes great, George", and Steinbrenner replying, "Less filling, Billy!", back and forth until Steinbrenner finally says, "You're fired!" (changed to "You're hired!" when Martin was re-hired by Steinbrenner in real life). Martin replies, "Not Again!"

As the popularity of the ads and the number of athletes and celebrities that appeared in them grew, Miller produced occasional "alumni" ads featuring all of the stars, generally in some sort of competition between the 'Less Fillings' and the 'Taste Greats'. The ads usually ended with Rodney Dangerfield somehow being the goat of the losing team. In one of the last spots to feature Dangerfield, the Miller Lite alumni are competing in a bowling match. It is the last frame of a tie game, and Ben Davidson grumbles to Dangerfield, "All we need is one pin, Rodney." Dangerfield rolls the ball down the lane, only to have it bounce horizontally off the head pin and into the gutter, knocking down zero pins.

As part of this campaign, Miller Brewing ran a series of  television commercials in the winter of 1993–1994 showing several fictitious "extreme sports" such as "Wiener Dog Drag Racing" (which featured two wiener dogs racing each other at a drag racing strip), "Sumo High Dive" (which depicted a Japanese sumo wrestler diving off a platform) and "The Miss Perfect Face-Off" (which featured beauty pageant contestants playing ice hockey).  The tag line that followed was, "If you can combine great taste with less filling, you can combine anything." and the question "Can your beer do this?"

In 1995-1996, Miller Lite ran the "Life Is Good" campaign, which showed Miller Lite drinkers' aspirational transition to more fun via a Miller Lite bottle tap, like "Beach Rewind", where three men on a beach admired three beautiful women walking by, and could rewind, and enjoy, the scene repeatedly.  The campaign was developed by Leo Burnett Company, and received the American Marketing Association EFFIE award for outstanding advertising effectiveness.  The campaign included celebrities such as Larry Bird, Keith Jackson, and Richard Karn.

Beginning January 12, 1997, a series of surrealistic Miller Lite ads, purportedly made by a man named "Dick", began to air. They were hallmarked as such either at the beginning or the end of the commercial. The campaign was developed by Minneapolis-based ad agency Fallon. The series of "Dick" commercials was directed by Gerald Casale of the new wave band Devo. Such commercials include one where a middle-aged man sees the message "twist to open" on a Miller Lite bottle cap, and he proceeds to do the Twist.

The ad campaign changed back to using high-profile celebrities who were either on opposite ends of the spectrum or had bragging rights to exchange with the other.  Notable pairings included the following:

 George Brett and Robin Yount.  Brett and Yount were both elected to the Baseball Hall of Fame in 1999 with 98 and 77 percent of the vote respectively while Yount won two MVP awards to Brett's one.
 Edgar Winter and George Hamilton. Winter's albinism was a stark contrast to the tanned look of Hamilton on screen.
 Ken Stabler and Dan Fouts. Stabler needles Fouts about never getting to or winning a Super Bowl while Fouts lets Stabler know about his inferior passing statistics.

In 2003, "Catfight", another high-profile commercial in the long-running "Great Taste...Less Filling" campaign, was denounced by critics as depicting women as sexual objects. The commercial featured two beautiful young women, a blonde (Tanya Ballinger) and a brunette (Kitana Baker), discussing the classic "Great Taste/Less Filling" debate, except they engaged in a catfight, hence the ad's title. The fight moving from a fountain to a mud pit, with the girls stripping each other of their clothing in the process. An uncensored version of the commercial ended in the muddy beauties, stripped down to their underwear, sharing a passionate kiss. The girls received much publicity from the commercial, and later starred in a few related commercials, videos and events.

In 2006, Miller Lite had an advertising campaign called Man Laws featuring celebrities that include actor Burt Reynolds, professional wrestler Triple H, comedian Eddie Griffin, and former American football player Jerome Bettis. The celebrities and other actors were in a "Men of the Square Table", a group meeting where they discuss different situations that should be included in the "Man Laws". The ads were developed by the ad agency Crispin Porter + Bogusky/Miami, and were directed by comedy film director Peter Farrelly.

In June 2010, commercials premiered featuring actresses Lindsey McKeon and Nadine Heimann as bartenders.

Motorsport sponsorship

Miller Brewing Company began their NASCAR sponsorship in 1983 with driver Bobby Allison, advertising the Miller High Life brand and later in 1990 with driver Rusty Wallace, advertising the Miller Genuine Draft brand. In 1997, the company began advertising the Miller Lite brand on Wallace's #2 Penske Racing car. The car later earned the nickname "Blue Deuce", due to its number and blue paint scheme. Wallace retired following the 2005 season, and Kurt Busch was named as his replacement. Busch drove the "Blue Deuce" from 2006 to 2010. The car was driven by Brad Keselowski, who won the 2012 Sprint Cup Series championship.  Miller Brewing has since dropped the sponsorship from the #2 car, with the last sponsorship occurring during the 2020 Coca-Cola 600.

Other promotion in motorsport included the sponsoring of Don Prudhomme's Larry Dixon-driven NHRA top fuel dragster from 1997 to 2007. Prior to that, Dixon was sponsored by Miller Genuine Draft. Additionally, Miller Brewing sponsored the Unlimited hydroplane of R.B. "Bob" Taylor in 1984 with the U-7 "Lite All-Star", driven by Tom D'Eath.  The following year, Miller switched teams and brands with the "Miller American" Unlimited hydroplane owned by Fran Muncey and Jim Lucero—which resulted in the 1985 National Championship, and APBA Gold Cup wins in 1985, 1986, and 1987, driven by Chip Hanauer.

For the first time in a video game, it was featured in NASCAR '15: Victory Edition and NASCAR Heat Evolution as a sponsor available to users verified to be over 21 years of age.

References

External links

 Official website
Important dates in the history of Miller Brewing Co. San Antonio Express-News.

Products introduced in 1975
American beer brands
Molson Coors brands